Stephen Angus Fairnie (died 22 February 1993) was a British musician, artist and actor, the frontman of the post-punk band Writz, and as one half, with Bev Sage, of the 1980s outfit Techno Twins (later just The Technos).

Career
Writz became a fixture on the post-punk London scene, headlining at major venues including the Marquee Club.

Fairnie and Sage continued as the Techno Twins, covering "Falling in Love Again", which charted in 1982, and releasing Swing Together, a Glenn Miller-meets-Marilyn Monroe pastiche. The album Technostalgia followed, and in 1985, as The Technos, Foreign Land—produced, amongst others, by Anne Dudley of Art of Noise—was issued to critical acclaim but minimal sales. In August 1985, the Technos performed their last-ever live show at the Greenbelt festival, an annual Christian event with which they had been heavily involved from its inception more than a decade earlier.

As a fine artist, Fairnie's most prominent pieces were created in the second half of the 1980s to his death in 1993. He also received many commissions to illustrate magazines and books, including for US poet Robert Lax's 24th and 7th.

In 1993, Fairnie died from an asthma attack while on a field trip to Brixham, Devon, with a group of students from Weston-super-Mare College, where he was a lecturer. Despite his limited commercial success ("The thing I hate most about myself is my complete inability to make money.")

Selected works

Discography

Albums
1975: Fish Co - Can't Be Bad
1979: Fish Co - Beneath the Laughter
1979: Writz - Writz
1982: Techno Twins - Technostalgia
1982: Techno Orchestra - Casualtease
1985: The Technos - Foreign Land
1988: The Technos - Songs for a Nervous World

Singles
1979: Writz - "Night Nurse" (7", with free paper facemask and 12")

Art

1975: Houseworks - Home Is Where the Art Is - exhibition, London (with Mark Dunhill)
1983: Techno Exhibition - The Art Centre, London
1987: Casualtease Video Missionaries performance - art show, Bristol
1993: Illustrations for Robert Lax's 24th & 7th (Stride Publications)

Acting
1986: The Kid, BBC

References

1993 deaths
20th-century male musicians
deaths from asthma
respiratory disease deaths in England